Seyidqışlaq (also, Seidkyshlak, Seydkyshlag, and Seydkyshlak) is a village and municipality in the Qabala Rayon of Azerbaijan.  It has a population of 488.

References 

Populated places in Qabala District